East Calgary is a former village in Alberta, Canada that is now within the City of Calgary. Located on the north side of 17 Avenue SE (Highway 1A) between 60 Street SE and 84 Street SE, East Calgary held village status for just over three years between 1916 and 1919.

History 
The Village of East Calgary was incorporated on April 17, 1916. The village was dissolved on July 17, 1919 and became under the jurisdiction of the Municipal District of Shepard No. 220.

Geography 
The Village of East Calgary comprised four quarter sections of land located on the north side of 17 Avenue SE (Highway 1A) between 60 Street SE and 84 Street SE. Stoney Trail (Highway 216) runs through the eastern portion of the former village. Much of the former village is now located within Calgary's residential neighbourhoods of Applewood Park, Penbrooke Meadows and Red Carpet.

Notes

See also 
List of former urban municipalities in Alberta

References 

Former municipalities now in Calgary
Former villages in Alberta